Franklin High School (FHS) is a comprehensive four-year public high school serving students in ninth through twelfth grades, located in the Somerset section of Franklin Township in Somerset County, New Jersey, United States, operating as the lone secondary school of the Franklin Township Public Schools.

As of the 2021–22 school year, the school had an enrollment of 2,176 students and 185.9 classroom teachers (on an FTE basis), for a student–teacher ratio of 11.7:1. There were 762 students (35.0% of enrollment) eligible for free lunch and 177 (8.1% of students) eligible for reduced-cost lunch.

Awards, recognition and rankings
The school was the 203rd-ranked public high school in New Jersey out of 339 schools statewide in New Jersey Monthly magazine's September 2014 cover story on the state's "Top Public High Schools", using a new ranking methodology. The school had been ranked 263rd in the state of 328 schools in 2012, after being ranked 201st in 2010 out of 322 schools listed. The magazine ranked the school 150th out of 316 schools in 2008.

History

The original Franklin High School, now Franklin Middle School, was opened in 1961. Prior to that, the district sent its high school students to Princeton High School, Bound Brook High School, Highland Park High School, and New Brunswick High School among others. The original Franklin High School was designed to accommodate 1,600 students. By the mid 1990s, the student population had grown to over 2,000 making overcrowding a serious issue. In 2001, the residents of Franklin Township voted for the construction of a new High School.  Construction began in 2002 and finished in September 2005. In that same month, the new Franklin High School opened its doors.

Among the persons who have served as Principal of Franklin High School are Orville Wilson, Dr. Howard Lucks, Dr. Neely Hackett, James Bevere, Dr. Thomas DiGanci as Interim Principal from September 2014 to June 2016, and Cheryl A. Clark. Dr. DiGanci was the former principal of Watchung Hills Regional High School, where he was employed as principal for forty years before retiring in 2012. Ron Brundidge also served as an interim principal. Cheryl A. Clark previously served as the principal of Irvington's University Elementary School in Irvington, NJ. In 2018, Frank Chmiel, who previously served as the school's vice principal was selected to be the new principal, serving until April 2021, when he accepted the position to become the educational leader of Princeton High School. At the time of his departure, his administration team included four vice principals and the athletic director. Dr. Nicholas Solomon, the principal of Franklin Middle School, was selected at the Board of Education's June 16, 2021 meeting to succeed Chimel.

Academics

Courses
FHS offers a wide selection of courses to suit all types of students. Honors level courses in the core content areas and in the areas of the Fine and Performing Arts and of Technology. The school offers business and vocational programs offering training and practical application in real world situations. Students can earn certification in Cisco Systems, acquire television production and studio recording skills, and participate in a variety of internship and co-op experiences offered through local area businesses. Students may choose to attend Somerset County Vocational and Technical High School either part-time or full-time. There students learn the core curriculum along with various skills such as auto shop and culinary arts.

The school offers an open Advanced Placement (AP) college-level courses. Any student can register for an AP course as along as he has completed the prerequisites. For example, it is not uncommon for sophomores to take AP United States History. The AP courses FHS has (as of the 21-22 school year) include:

Certain students who have completed the majority of courses in a department have a chance to take college courses in local colleges. In many cases, these courses will earn the student college credit that can be transferred to their college at the school's discretion. In the past, seniors have taken courses in Princeton University, Rutgers University, and Raritan Valley Community College.

Curriculum
Franklin High School students need to earn a total of 120 credits to be eligible for graduation. The vast majority of the year-long courses give 5 credits each while a half-year course offers 2.5 credits. The exceptions to this rule are the science classes with labs. An extra credit is given for each lab day in the 4-day cycle. AP sciences classes with a lab (AP Biology, AP Chemistry, AP Physics 1, & AP Physics C) give the students 6 credits. The credit spread for incoming classes is as follows:

Academic excellence
Franklin High School students have been recognized by the National Merit Scholarship Program, Advance Placement Scholar Awards, Edward J. Bloustein Distinguished Scholars Program.

Athletics
The Franklin High School Warriors compete in the Skyland Conference, which is comprised of public and private high schools in Hunterdon, Somerset and Warren counties in west Central Jersey and operates under the jurisdiction of the New Jersey State Interscholastic Athletic Association (NJSIAA). With 1,659 students in grades 10-12, the school was classified by the NJSIAA for the 2019–20 school year as Group IV for most athletic competition purposes, which included schools with an enrollment of 1,060 to 5,049 students in that grade range. The football team competes in Division 5B of the Big Central Football Conference, which includes 60 public and private high schools in Hunterdon, Middlesex, Somerset, Union and Warren counties, which are broken down into 10 divisions by size and location. The school was classified by the NJSIAA as Group V South for football for 2018–2020.

Sports offered by the Franklin High School Warriors athletic department include:
baseball, 
basketball (boys and girls), 
bowling (boys and girls), 
cheerleading, 
cross country (boys and girls), 
field hockey, 
football, 
indoor track (boys and girls), 
soccer (boys and girls), 
softball, 
spring track (boys and girls), 
swimming (boys and girls), 
tennis (boys and girls) and 
wrestling.

The boys' bowling team won the overall state championship in 1975 and 1977.

The field hockey team won the North I Group I state sectional championship in 1977, 1980 and 1981.

The boys tennis team won the Group III state championship in 1982, defeating Millburn High School 3-2 in the final match of the tournament.

The football team won the Central Jersey Group III state sectional title in 1984, 1987, 1989, 1990, 1994 and 1996. The 1990 team won the Central Jersey Group III title with a 20-16 win against Ocean Township High School on a touchdown scored with under a minute left in the game. A 39-25 win against Neptune High School at Giants Stadium gave the 1994 team the Central Jersey Group III title. The team finished the 1996 season with a 10-1 record after defeating Hamilton High School West by a score of 26-3 at Giants Stadium in the Central Jersey Group III championship game.

The boys' track team won the Group III indoor relay championships in 1989, 1990 and 2006; the girls' track team won the relay title in Group III in 1991 and 1992, and in Group IV in 2015.

The boys indoor track team won the Group III state title in 1990 and the Group IV title in 2019; The girls won the indoor track title in Group III in 1992 and 2005.

The girls team won the NJSIAA spring track state championship in Group III in 1993 and 2003.

The girls swimming team won the Public B state championship in 1996.

The boys spring track team won the Group III championship in 1997 and the Group IV titles in 2017 and 2019.

The boys' basketball team won the Group III state title in 2003, defeating runner-up Cranford High School by a score of 66-59 in the finals.

The girls basketball team won the Group IV state championship in 2015 (defeating Shawnee High School in the tournament final), 2017 (vs. Sayreville High School), 2018 (vs. Toms River High School North) and 2019 (vs. Lenape High School); due to the cancellation of group finals due to COVID-19, the team was declared as North IV regional champion in 2020. The 2015 team won the program's first state title with a 54-58 win against Shawnee in the Group IV championship game. In 2017, the team won the Group IV title, defeating Sayreville High School by a score of 68-36 in the finals of the playoffs. The team went on to win the NJSIAA Tournament of Champions, defeating Manasquan High School in the tournament's final game. The 2019 team won the Group IV title with a 73-35 win against Lenape in the tournament final and moved on to the Tournament of Champions as the top seed, winning the semifinal round by a score of 55-50 against number-five seed St. Rose High School before taking the finals against number-two seed Saddle River Day School by a score of 65-57, setting the state record for wins in a season with a 34-0 mark for the year.

The boys' outdoor team won and set a new record time at the Penn Relays with a time of 41.98 seconds to win the boys 4x100 Large School title in 2016.

Extracurricular activities
Extracurricular activities provide an excellent medium for FHS students to explore their interests, learn, and help the community. Most "clubs" meet after school when additional buses are available for after school transportation. Some clubs such as Brass Ensemble, Guitar Ensemble, and Model United Nations meet at night, in which cases the students are responsible for their own transportation. The Franklin High School Junior Classical league(JCL), recently hosted New Jersey JCL state convention at FHS. Recently, the Model United Nations club has won awards at several major conferences, including National High Schook Model UN conference (NHSMUN) 2021 and Rutgers Model Congress (RMC) 2022. They are also ranked in the top 10 in the country. Clubs offered at Franklin High School include:
Note: Some information may be inaccurate due to clubs forming or disbanding.

Performing arts
Stage productions such as Beauty and The Beast (2009), Sweeney Todd (2010), Hello, Dolly! (2011), Phantom of the Opera, (1994 and 2012) Aida (2013), In The Heights (2014), Jekyll & Hyde (musical)(2015), Mary Poppins (2016), and Sister Act (musical) (2017), Into the Woods (2018), Rent (2018), West Side Story (2019) have been performed by the students of Franklin High School.

Administration
Members of the school administration are:
Nicholas Solomon, Principal
Genesi Martinez, Freshman Vice Principal
Michael A. Herman, Sophomore Vice Principal
Sheronda Martin, Junior Vice Principal
Rod Brundidge, Senior Vice Principal

Notable alumni

 Carlton Agudosi (born 1994, class of 2012), wide receiver for the Arizona Cardinals of the NFL.
 Frank Baker (1944-2010), outfielder who played in MLB for the Cleveland Indians.
 Soufiane Choubani (born 1984), founder of the Moroccan National Debate Team, which became the first North African nation to compete in the World Schools Debating Championships.
 Krystyna Freda (born 1993), footballer who plays as a forward for Cypriot First Division club Apollon Ladies FC.
 Roy Hinson (born 1961), NBA basketball player who played for the Cleveland Cavaliers, Philadelphia 76ers and New Jersey Nets.
 Daryle Lamont Jenkins (born 1968), civil rights activist and founder of One People's Project.
 Diamond Miller (born 2001), college basketball player for the Maryland Terrapins women's basketball team.
 Joe Pace (born 1953), former professional basketball player who played in the NBA for the Washington Bullets. 
 Jeff Porter (born 1985, class of 2003), track and field athlete who competes in the 110-meter hurdles.
 Joe Porter (born 1985), cornerback who played in the NFL for the Green Bay Packers, Cleveland Browns and Oakland Raiders.
 Jim Stoops (born 1972), former professional baseball pitcher who played for one season in MLB for the Colorado Rockies.

References

External links

School Data for the Franklin Township Public Schools, National Center for Education Statistics

1961 establishments in New Jersey
Educational institutions established in 1961
Franklin Township, Somerset County, New Jersey
Public high schools in Somerset County, New Jersey